Pamela Whitten is an American academic administrator and telemedicine specialist. She currently serves as the 19th president of Indiana University and is the first female president in the university's history. She previously served as the 5th president of Kennesaw State University and served on the NCAA Division I Committee on Academics.

Early life and education
Pamela Whitten grew up in Tennessee. She lived in Brentwood and Memphis before her family moved when she was 14.

Whitten earned her bachelor's degree in management from Tulane University School of Business in 1985, her master's degree in organizational communication from the University of Kentucky in 1986 and her PhD in communication studies from the University of Kansas in 1996.

Career
Whitten is a telemedicine specialist. She has published over 100 peer reviewed articles and two books about the subject.

After receiving her PhD in communication studies from University of Kansas in 1996, Whitten became an Assistant Professor in the Department of Family Medicine at the University of Kansas Medical Center. In 1998, she moved to Michigan State University as an Assistant Professor in the Department of Telecommunications. She was promoted to Associate Professor and later to full Professor in 2001 and 2005 respectively.

Academic administration
At Michigan State, Whitten was promoted to Assistant Dean, Associate Dean, and then full dean for the College of Communication Arts & Sciences at Michigan State in 2006, 2007, and 2009 respectively.

She served as director of telemedicine at the University of Kansas Medical Center and the Michigan State University dean of College of Communication Arts and Science.

Whitten was provost and senior vice president for academic affairs at the University of Georgia from 2014 until 2018. She was a finalist for the position of chancellor of University of Tennessee, Knoxville, in 2016 and also president of the Iowa State University in 2017. In 2018, Whitten became president of Kennesaw State University. The following year, in 2019, she joined the NCAA Division I Committee on Academics.

Whitten was named to the Atlanta Business Chronicle's list of "Atlanta's Most Admired CEOs" in 2020. On April 16, 2021, the Indiana University (IU) board of trustees named Whitten the 19th President-Elect of the university. This makes Whitten the first woman to ever hold the position of president at IU. Her term as IU president started on July 1, 2021. The presidential search that led to Whitten's appointment was the source of considerable controversy, praising the appointment's contribution to diversity yet questioning her fit for the position.

References

Living people
Year of birth missing (living people) 
Telemedicine
Presidents of Kennesaw State University
Presidents of Indiana University
University of Kansas faculty
Academics from Tennessee
Tulane University alumni
University of Kentucky alumni
University of Kansas alumni
Michigan State University faculty
University of Georgia faculty
National Collegiate Athletic Association people
Women heads of universities and colleges